Judit Hernádi (born 11 April 1956) is a Hungarian actress.

Selected filmography
 The Fortress (1979)
 Mephisto (1981)
 Another Way (1982)
 The Last Manuscript (1987)
 Out of Order (1997)

External links

Hernádi Judit, port.hu

References

1956 births
Hungarian film actresses
Hungarian stage actresses
Hungarian television actresses
Actresses from Budapest
Living people